Annapolis was a federal electoral district in Nova Scotia, Canada, that was represented in the House of Commons of Canada from 1867 to 1917. The district was created in the British North America Act, 1867. It was abolished in 1914 when it was redistributed into Digby and Annapolis. It consisted of Annapolis County, Nova Scotia.

Geography

This riding was set by the British North America Act, 1867 to consist of Annapolis County. The boundaries were not changed during the electoral redistributions of 1872, 1882, 1892 or 1903. This riding was dissolved into Digby and Annapolis in the 1914 electoral redistribution. The county was legally defined in 1837 as such:

Members of Parliament

Election results

See also

 List of Canadian federal electoral districts
 Past Canadian electoral districts

Notes

References

External links
Riding history for Annapolis (1867 – 1914) from the Library of Parliament

Former federal electoral districts of Nova Scotia
Annapolis County, Nova Scotia